Philip Ridsdale (b Hendon 2 December 1915 - d Cambridge 14 June 2000) was an Anglican bishop in Zaire: he served as the inaugural  Bishop of Boga-Zaire.

Ridsdale was  educated at Harrow; Trinity College, Cambridge; and Ridley Hall, Cambridge. Ridsdale served in Uganda and the Democratic Republic of the Congo, as a CMS missionary before the war and as an ordained priest after it. During World War II itself he served with the King's African Rifles, and was wounded in Burma in 1945. He was Rural Dean of Hoima then Archdeacon of Rwenzori. From 1964 to 1972 he was the incumbent at Stapleford, Hertfordshire (and Rural Dean of Hertford). In 1972 he went back as bishop, retiring in 1980.

References

People from Hendon
Anglican bishops of Boga-Zaire
20th-century Anglican bishops in Africa
Anglican missionaries in Uganda
1915 births
2000 deaths
People educated at Harrow School
Alumni of Trinity College, Cambridge
Alumni of Ridley Hall, Cambridge
Church of England missionary work
Anglican archdeacons in Africa
King's African Rifles officers